Perplexity is a measurement of how well a probability distribution or probability model predicts a sample.

Perplexity may also refer to:
 Perplexity (video game), a 1990 video game
 Perplex City, an alternate reality game (ARG)